Oppedisano is a surname. Notable people with the surname include:

 Domenico Oppedisano (born 1930), Italian criminal
 Marco Oppedisano (born 1971), American guitarist and composer